The City Tekke of Vushtrri is a tomb and a cultural heritage monument in Vushtrri, Kosovo. It is named a teqe or tekke because the local Sufi monastery or khanqah, so named in the region, is nearby.

History
The tomb lies at the center of the city park, near the schools. The octagonal crypt contains six graves, said to belong to Sufi sheikhs but also speculated to be those of high-ranking Ottoman soldiers. A shrine cult has emerged around the tomb, where candles are lit and thin metal sleeves thrown in. Those seeking luck or holding vigil will often be found there.

The graves once stretched all the way to the sports fields, but the gravestones were flattened into the current park by the Socialist Federal Republic of Yugoslavia government after World War II. This fate also befell the graves on the western side of the Old Fortress near the Vojinović Tower. The oral recounting of shrine custodian Ajet Havarda holds that the tekke was built 200 years ago.

See also 
 Vushtrri
 Sanjak of Viçitrina
 List of monuments in Vushtrri

References

External links
 Database of Cultural Heritage of Kosovo

Historic sites in Kosovo
Cultural heritage monuments in Vushtrri
Khanqahs in Kosovo